Arkansas Highway 24 is the designation of two separate state highways in southwest and south central Arkansas.

Section 1
It runs from Oklahoma east to US 71 in Lockesburg.

Route description
The route begins at the Oklahoma state line as CR E2100 in McCurtain County, Oklahoma and runs east to Horatio. AR 24 has a short concurrency with AR 41 in Horatio, but continues east alone. The route is the southern terminus of AR 329 (a former alignment of US 71) before terminating at US 71 in Lockesburg.

Major intersections

Section 2

Route description
The route begins at U.S. Route 371 in Prescott and runs east through the Prairie D'Ane Battlefield. The route intersects a few minor routes near Bluff City and near White Oak Lake State Park before entering Ouachita County. The route also meets AR 368, which leads to the Poison Springs Wildlife Management Area. AR 24 meets AR 57 in Chidester and AR 76, which runs to Poison Springs Battleground State Park near Bragg Lake. The route continues east past the Richmond-Tufts House and Harvey's Grocery and Texaco Station and terminates at US 278 in Camden. The route runs through mostly forested areas.

A two-mile (3.2 km) segment of Highway 24 in Ouachita County was awarded a Perpetual Pavement Award by the Asphalt Pavement Alliance in 2017, awarded on the basis of longevity and structural design. Opened in 1972, the roadway was first resurfaced in 2014.

Major intersections

See also

 List of state highways in Arkansas

References

External links

024
Transportation in Sevier County, Arkansas
Transportation in Nevada County, Arkansas
Transportation in Ouachita County, Arkansas